Percy Hughes may refer to:

 Percy Hughes (footballer) (born 1868), Welsh international footballer
 Percy Hughes (philosopher) (1872–1952), American philosopher and teacher

See also
 Hughes (surname)